Andrew Esinhart (December 27, 1838 – ca 1915) was a merchant and political figure in Quebec. He represented La Prairie in the Legislative Assembly of Quebec from 1871 to 1875 as a Conservative.

He was born in La Prairie, Lower Canada, the son of Andrew Eisenhart and Charlotte Barbeau, and became a merchant there. Esinhart owned a sawmill at Sainte-Clothilde and also operated a brick factory which failed in 1870. In 1867, he married Marie-Ézelda Valotte. He was defeated by Léon-Benoît-Alfred Charlebois when he ran for reelection to the Quebec assembly in 1875. In 1876, he moved to Iberville, where he owned a general store and grain warehouse. Esinhart was mayor of Iberville from 1882 to 1883. He later moved to the United States, where he died around 1915.

References
 

1838 births
Year of death missing
Conservative Party of Quebec MNAs
Mayors of places in Quebec